Bar Council of Punjab and Haryana is the state regulatory and statutory representative body for lawyers practicing law in the three states of Punjab and Haryana and Union Territory of Chandigarh. It was constituted as per the mandatory requirement of Advocates Act, 1961 and Bar Council of India. In March 1953, the 'All India Bar Committee', headed by S. R. Das, submitted a report which proposed the creation of a Bar Council for each state and an All-India Bar Council as an apex body. Members of the Bar Council are elected from amongst members enrolled and practicing as lawyers in Punjab, Haryana and Chandigarh, and they represent the state in Bar Council of India meetings. Bar Council enforces standards of professional conduct to be followed by member advocates, and designs etiquettes and has the power to enforce disciplinary guidelines over the members of Bar.

History 
Bar Council of Punjab and Haryana was formed as per the requirement of Section 3 of Advocates Act, 1961 which mandates for each state of India to have its Bar Council. Accordingly, Bar Council of Punjab and Haryana was formed. As per the guidelines the legal profession in India and the standards of legal education would be regulated by All India Bar Council. The Law Commission of India was assigned the job of assembling a report on judicial administration reforms.

Functions 
6. Functions of State Bar Councils.―(1) The functions of a State Bar Council shall be―

(a) to admit persons as advocates on its roll;
(b) to prepare and maintain such roll;
(c) to entertain and determine cases of misconduct against advocates on its roll;
(d) to safeguard the rights, privileges and interests of advocates on its roll;
[(dd) to promote the growth of Bar Associations for the purposes of effective implementation of the
welfare schemes referred to in clause (a) of sub-section (2) of this section and clause (a) of sub-section (2)
of section 7;]
(e) to promote and support law reform;
[(ee) to conduct seminars and organise talks on legal topics by eminent jurists and publish journals
and papers of legal interest;
(eee) to organise legal aid to the poor in the prescribed manner;]
(f) to manage and invest the funds of the Bar Council;
(g) to provide for the election of its members;
[(gg) to visit and inspect Universities in accordance with the directions given under clause (i) of
sub-section (1) of section 7;]
(h) to perform all other functions conferred on it by or under this Act;
(i) to do all other things necessary for discharging the aforesaid functions.

[(2) A State Bar Council may constitute one or more funds in the prescribed manner for the purpose of—
of—
(a) giving financial assistance to organise welfare schemes for the indigent, disabled or other
advocates;
(b) giving legal aid or advice in accordance with the rules made in this behalf;
[(c) establishing law libraries.]

(3) A State Bar Council may receive any grants, donations, gifts or benefactions for all or any of the
purposes specified in sub-section (2) which shall be credited to the appropriate fund or funds constituted under
that sub-section.]

Constitution 
The State Council elects its own Chairman and Vice-Chairman i.e. the two statutory posts  for a period of two years from amongst its members along with one Member Representative to the Bar Council of India for five years. Assisted by the various committees of the Council, the Chairman acts as the chief executive and director of the Council. Voting rights in general elections (for electing 25 Members to the Council) are available only for advocates having a Certificate of Practice. Till the year 2021, there were around 1,00,000 enrolled as members of the state Bar Council, and now in 2023 the number has grown by ten thousand newly enrolled lawyers each year. As per the Advocates Act, the Bar Council of the state should have 25 members in case the members on roll exceeds 10000 and accordingly Bar Council of Punjab and Haryana has 25 members and two ex-office being the Advocate General's of the two states i.e. Punjab and Haryana.

Suvir Sidhu was elected as youngest Chairman of Bar Council of Punjab and Haryana in 2022. Earlier he got elected as the youngest Member at the age of 27.

Enrollment of advocates
Graduates having a law degree from recognised universities permitted to impart legal education are admitted as advocates in Bar Council of Punjab and Haryana. Law graduates can enroll online for Bar Council of Punjab and Haryana. State bar councils are empowered by Advocates Act, 1961 to frame rules according to their convenience for enrolling advocates in council. The enrollment committee formed by Councils will scrutinise a prospective member's application. Enrolled advocates of any bar council in state are considered as eligible to write the All India Bar Examination conducted by the Bar Council of India. After clearing the exam, he is certified by the Bar Council of India and issued the 'Certificate of Enrolment', which facilitates him to practice the profession of law in any High Court based in India and lower courts of the country, as an advocate. Advocates are required to qualify in the exam known as "Supreme Court Advocate on Record Examination" which is conducted by the Supreme Court exclusively to practice in the Supreme Court of Country.

Important actions 
In April 2021, Bar Council of Punjab and Haryana removed former IPS officer Kunwar Vijay Pratap Singh after he requested for the same and also from the facility of Co-option and member of its disciplinary committee after some members complained against the position held by him.
In August 2021, Bar Council of Punjab and Haryana through its election tribunal had invalidated executive body elections of Chandigarh District Bar Association.

See also
Bar Council of India

References

External links 
 official website

Legal organisations based in India
Organisations based in Chandigarh